The 1987 St. Louis Cardinals season was the franchise's 68th season in the National Football League and the 28th and final season in St. Louis as the team moved to Tempe, Arizona in March 1988. This move left St. Louis without an NFL franchise until the Los Angeles Rams moved there in 1995 to play, only to relocate back to Los Angeles in 2016, once again leaving St. Louis without an NFL team.

Offseason

NFL draft

Personnel

Staff

NFL replacement players 
After the league decided to use replacement players during the NFLPA strike, the following team was assembled:

Roster

Regular season

Schedule

Week 8

Standings

Awards and records 
 Luis Sharpe, NFC Pro Bowl selection
 J.T. Smith, NFL Receiving Leader, 91 Receptions 
 J.T. Smith, Led NFL, Receiving Yards, 1,117 yards 
 Ron Wolfley, Pro Bowl selection

References

External links 
 1987 St. Louis Cardinals at Pro-Football-Reference.com

Saint Louis
Arizona Cardinals seasons